Austriadactylus is a genus of "rhamphorhynchoid" pterosaur. The fossil remains were unearthed in Late Triassic (middle Norian age) rocks of Austria.
 
The genus was named in 2002 by Fabio Marco Dalla Vecchia e.a.. The type species is Austriadactylus cristatus. The genus name is derived from Latin Austria and Greek daktylos, "finger", in reference to the wing finger of pterosaurs. The specific epithet means "crested" in Latin, a reference to the skull crest.

The genus is based on holotype SMNS 56342, a crushed partial skeleton on a slab, found in an abandoned mine near Ankerschlag in Tyrol, in the Norian Seefelder Beds. The counterslab has been lost and with it some of the bone. The fossil consists of the skull, lower jaws, some vertebrae, parts of the limbs and pelvic girdle, and the first part of the tail.

The elongated skull has a length of 11 cm. It carried a bony crest that widened as it descended towards the snout, up to height of 2 cm. The triangular nares formed the largest skull openings. The also triangular fenestrae antorbitales are smaller than the orbits. The teeth differ in shape and the species was thus heterodont. Most teeth are small and tricuspid or three-pointed. In the front of the upper jaw five larger recurved  teeth with a single point form a prey grab; six or seven such teeth are also interspersed with the smaller teeth more to the back of the mouth. There are at least seventeen and perhaps as much as 25 tricuspid teeth in the upper jaw, for a total of perhaps 74 teeth of all sizes in the skull. The number of teeth in the lower jaws cannot be determined.

The flexible tail did not have the stiffening rod-like vertebral extensions present in other basal pterosaurs. The wingspan has been estimated at about 120 cm.

Austriadactylus was in 2002 assigned by the describers to a general Pterosauria incertae sedis, but some later analyses showed it to have been related to Campylognathoides and Eudimorphodon in the Campylognathoididae. It has even been suggested it was a junior synonym of Eudimorphodon, though perhaps a distinct species in that genus. The following phylogenetic analysis follows the topology of Upchurch et al. (2015).

See also

 Timeline of pterosaur research

References

External links
The Pterosaur Database (pdf)

Pterosaurs
Late Triassic pterosaurs of Europe
Fossil taxa described in 2002
Fossils of Austria